Simon Paul Ramsden (born 17 December 1981) is an English former professional footballer who played  as a defender.

He played for Sunderland, Notts County, Grimsby Town, Rochdale, Bradford City, Motherwell, Gateshead and Whitby Town.

Career

Sunderland
Born in Bishop Auckland, Ramsden started his career with Newton Aycliffe Youth Centre A.F.C., and was eventually scouted by Sunderland and after graduating from the club's youth academy he was promoted to the first team squad under Peter Reid during the 2001–02 season. He made his professional debut however for Notts County where he would spend the entire 2002–03 season on loan, with his debut coming on 24 August 2002, in the club's 2–0 league defeat against Wigan Athletic. In his absence Sunderland had dismissed Reid and his replacement Howard Wilkinson and were now under the stewardship of Mick McCarthy. On 24 January 2004 Ramsden came on as an 89th-minute substitute for Darren Williams in the club's FA Cup victory over Ipswich Town, this was his first and only first team appearance for Sunderland. Following the conclusion of the 2003–04 season, Ramsden was released by Sunderland.

Grimsby Town
Ramsden signed with Football League Two side Grimsby Town in July 2004. Initially signed as cover for Tony Crane and Justin Whittle, Ramsden soon became a first team regular in Russell Slade's side due to injuries to Crane and regular right back John McDermott. He made his Town debut on the opening day of the 2004–05 season when the club were defeated by Darlington 1–0. Ramsden soon lost his regular centre half place when Terrell Forbes was signed from Queens Park Rangers. At the end of his first season Ramsden played 26 times in both league and cup for Grimsby. During the 2005–06 season several new signings meant Ramsden very rarely featured and he was left the club in January 2006.

Rochdale
Ramsden joined Rochdale from Grimsby Town in January 2006. On 1 January 2007, he scored twice for Rochdale on his return to his former club Grimsby in a 4–0 win.

Bradford City
In June 2009, Ramsden became Bradford City's first signing of the summer. He started off well for the Bantams in his first season making 32 appearances and scoring 2 goals. He was named as the club captain at the start of the 2010–11 campaign, but featured in only 2 league games due to injuries. In the 2011–12 season he regained fitness and took part in a behind closed doors friendly in November against Tranmere Rovers, marking his return to action. Ramsden made his full return to the first team on 8 November 2011 in a Football League Trophy game against League One side Sheffield United. The game went to penalties and Ramsden scored his penalty as Bradford went on to win the shootout. He continued to feature for Bradford making 5 league appearances before breaking his toe in a 3–1 win over Shrewsbury. It was announced that he would be sidelined for 3–6 weeks.

Motherwell
Ramsden trained with Scottish Premier League team Motherwell on trial after turning down a contract offer from Bradford. He was then awarded a one-year contract by the club after his trial was successful. On 17 May 2013, after a successful first season in Scotland, Ramsden signed a new two-year contract with the club.

On 2 June 2015, Motherwell announced that Ramsden was amongst the players leaving the club, with his contract having expired.

Gateshead
On 10 July 2015, Ramsden signed for Gateshead, agreeing a one-year contract. He made 25 appearances, scoring 1 goal, before picking up an injury in December. He made no further appearances before being released at the end of the season.

Whitby Town
On 19 September he came out of retirement to join Whitby Town.

Personal life
Ramsden attended Robertswood County Combined Primary School in Chalfont St Peter, Buckinghamshire. 
Ramsden now works as a car salesman in Sunderland.

Ramsden grew up supporting Sunderland. Ramsden's father works as a social worker, which he considered as his biggest influence of his career and he's a father.

Career statistics

References

External links
Simon Ramsden profile at Motherwell FC official website

1981 births
Living people
Sportspeople from Bishop Auckland
Footballers from County Durham
Association football defenders
English footballers
Sunderland A.F.C. players
Notts County F.C. players
Grimsby Town F.C. players
Rochdale A.F.C. players
Bradford City A.F.C. players
Motherwell F.C. players
Gateshead F.C. players
English Football League players
Scottish Premier League players
Scottish Professional Football League players